The 2015 Touring Car Masters was an Australian motor racing series for Touring Cars manufactured between 1963 and 1976. It was sanctioned by the Confederation of Australian Motor Sport (CAMS) as a National Series with Touring Car Masters Pty Ltd appointed by CAMS as the Category Manager. The series was the ninth annual Touring Car Masters.

The Pro Masters class was won by John Bowe (Ford Mustang and Holden Torana SL/R 5000), Pro Am by Cameron Tilley (Chrysler Valiant Pacer), Pro Sport by Leo Tobin (Holden HQ Monaro), Invitational by Paul Freestone (Chevrolet Camaro SS) and Trans Am by Charlie O'Brien (Pontiac Firebird).

Calendar

The series was contested over eight rounds.

Classes
Each automobile was allocated into one of the following classes:
 Pro Masters - for professional drivers
 Pro Am - for part-timers or drivers competing for fun 
 Pro Sport - for those wishing to cross-enter in the same car 	
 Invitational
 Trans Am

Points system
Series points were awarded on the following basis within each class at each race.

Series standings

Notes & references

External links
 Image Gallery for 2015 Touring Cars Masters, www.touringcarmasters.com.au via web.archive.org

Touring Car Masters
Touring Car Masters